The Rouarné River is a river in the Micoud Quarter of the island nation of Saint Lucia.  It is on the windward side of the island and flows into the Atlantic Ocean.

See also
List of rivers of Saint Lucia

References
 

Rivers of Saint Lucia